Freshwater ecosystems are a subset of Earth's aquatic ecosystems. They include lakes, ponds, rivers, streams, springs, bogs, and wetlands. They can be contrasted with marine ecosystems, which have a larger salt content. Freshwater habitats can be classified by different factors, including temperature, light penetration, nutrients, and vegetation. There are three basic types of freshwater ecosystems: Lentic (slow moving water, including pools, ponds, and lakes), lotic (faster moving water, for example streams and rivers) and wetlands (areas where the soil is saturated or inundated for at least part of the time). Freshwater ecosystems contain 41% of the world's known fish species.

Freshwater ecosystems have undergone substantial transformations over time, which has impacted various characteristics of the ecosystems. Original attempts to understand and monitor freshwater ecosystems were spurred on by threats to human health (for example cholera outbreaks due to sewage contamination). Early monitoring focused on chemical indicators, then bacteria, and finally algae, fungi and protozoa. A new type of monitoring involves quantifying differing groups of organisms (macroinvertebrates, macrophytes and fish) and measuring the stream conditions associated with them. 

Threats to freshwater biodiversity include overexploitation, water pollution, flow modification, destruction or degradation of habitat, and invasion by exotic species. Climate change is putting further pressure on these ecosystems because water temperatures have already increased by about 1°C, and there have been significant declines in ice coverage which have caused subsequent ecosystem stresses.

Types
There are three basic types of freshwater ecosystems: Lentic (slow moving water, including pools, ponds, and lakes), lotic (faster moving water, for example streams and rivers) and wetlands (areas where the soil is saturated or inundated for at least part of the time). Limnology (and its branch freshwater biology) is a study about freshwater ecosystems.

Lentic ecosystems

Lotic ecosystems

Wetlands

Threats

Biodiversity 
Five broad threats to freshwater biodiversity include overexploitation, water pollution, flow modification, destruction or degradation of habitat, and invasion by exotic species. Recent extinction trends can be attributed largely to sedimentation, stream fragmentation, chemical and organic pollutants, dams, and invasive species. Common chemical stresses on freshwater ecosystem health include acidification, eutrophication and copper and pesticide contamination.

Freshwater biodiversity faces many threats. The World Wide Fund for Nature's Living Planet Index noted an 83% decline in the populations of freshwater vertebrates between 1970 and 2014. These declines continue to outpace contemporaneous declines in marine or terrestrial systems. The causes of these declines are related to: 

 A rapidly changing climate
 Online wildlife trade and invasive species
 Infectious disease
 Toxic algae blooms
 Hydropower damming and fragmenting of half the world's rivers
 Emerging contaminants, such as hormones
 Engineered nanomaterials
 Microplastic pollution
 Light and noise interference
 Saltier coastal freshwaters due to sea level rise
 Calcium concentrations falling below the needs of some freshwater organisms
 The additive—and possibly synergistic—effects of these threats

Extinction of freshwater fauna 
Over 123 freshwater fauna species have gone extinct in North America since 1900. Of North American freshwater species, an estimated 48.5% of mussels, 22.8% of gastropods, 32.7% of crayfishes, 25.9% of amphibians, and 21.2% of fish are either endangered or threatened. Extinction rates of many species may increase severely into the next century because of invasive species, loss of keystone species, and species which are already functionally extinct (e.g., species which are not reproducing). Even using conservative estimates, freshwater fish extinction rates in North America are 877 times higher than background extinction rates (1 in 3,000,000 years). Projected extinction rates for freshwater animals are around five times greater than for land animals, and are comparable to the rates for rainforest communities.  Given the dire state of freshwater biodiversity, a team of scientists and practitioners from around the globe recently drafted an Emergency Action plan to try and restore freshwater biodiversity.

Current freshwater biomonitoring techniques focus primarily on community structure, but some programs measure functional indicators like biochemical (or biological) oxygen demand, sediment oxygen demand, and dissolved oxygen. Macroinvertebrate community structure is commonly monitored because of the diverse taxonomy, ease of collection, sensitivity to a range of stressors, and overall value to the ecosystem. Additionally, algal community structure (often using diatoms) is measured in biomonitoring programs. Algae are also taxonomically diverse, easily collected, sensitive to a range of stressors, and overall valuable to the ecosystem. Algae grow very quickly and communities may represent fast changes in environmental conditions.

In addition to community structure, responses to freshwater stressors are investigated by experimental studies that measure organism behavioural changes, altered rates of growth, reproduction or mortality. Experimental results on single species under controlled conditions may not always reflect natural conditions and multi-species communities.

The use of reference sites is common when defining the idealized "health" of a freshwater ecosystem. Reference sites can be selected spatially by choosing sites with minimal impacts from human disturbance and influence. However, reference conditions may also be established temporally by using preserved indicators such as diatom valves, macrophyte pollen, insect chitin and fish scales can be used to determine conditions prior to large scale human disturbance. These temporal reference conditions are often easier to reconstruct in standing water than moving water because stable sediments can better preserve biological indicator materials.

Climate change 

The effects of climate change greatly complicate and frequently exacerbate the impacts of other stressors that threaten many fish, invertebrates, phytoplankton, and other organisms. Climate change is increasing the average temperature of water bodies, and worsening other issues such as changes in substrate composition, oxygen concentration, and other system changes that have ripple effects on the biology of the system. Water temperatures have already increased by around 1°C, and significant declines in ice coverage have caused subsequent ecosystem stresses.

See also

 Ecology
 Freshwater

References 

Freshwater ecology
 
Ecosystems
 
Limnology
 
Fisheries science
Systems ecology
Water